There are over 9,000 Grade I listed buildings in England. This page is a list of these buildings in the district of Redcar and Cleveland in North Yorkshire.

Redcar and Cleveland

|}

Notes

External links

Redcar and Cleveland
Redcar